Melyssa Savannah Ford (born November 7, 1976) is a Canadian media personality, actress, and former video vixen. She attended York University and studied in the field of forensic psychology.  She is often referred to as Jessica Rabbit, an animated character whose sensuous figure Ford's is said to resemble.

Entertainment career
In the late 1990s, music video director Little X discovered Ford, who is in her early 20s, while she was working as a bartender at a Toronto nightclub and helped launch her modelling career. She has appeared in music videos, men's magazines, television programs and films. Ford was an on-air personality for Sirius Satellite Radio's Hot Jamz channel. She sells a line of calendars and a DVD.

In a 2008 CNN interview, Ford explained that when making music videos she often asked herself whether she was "perpetuating a negative stereotype" about black women. When she was asked whether music videos, overall, are "demeaning to women", Ford replied, "Yes, I definitely have to say that".

From June 2014 to January 2015, Ford participated in the Bravo Network television series Blood, Sweat & Heels, documenting her social life against the background of her struggles of becoming a realtor in New York.

In 2016, Ford became a co-host of Hollywood Unlocked, a hip-hop and pop culture radio show.  In June 2018, Ford was seriously injured in a car crash involving an 18-wheeler truck.  She suffered a skull fracture and concussion. Ford returned to the show in April 2019 following her accident.  On August 24, 2020, Ford announced she would no longer be co-hosting Hollywood Unlocked. In November 2019, Ford launched a podcast on YouTube called I'm Here for the Food.   The podcast featured a host of guests and covered a range of topics, including colourism, human trafficking, and forgiveness. The podcast last aired in November 2020.

Personal life
Forde is of mixed-race. Her father has Barbados roots and her mother is of Norwegian and Russian descent.

Filmography

Film

Television

Music Videos

Video Games

See also
Hip hop models

References

External links
 
 

1976 births
Actresses from Toronto
Black Canadian actresses
Canadian advice columnists
Female models from Ontario
Canadian infotainers
Canadian people of Barbadian descent
Canadian people of Ukrainian descent
Canadian people of Scottish descent
Canadian television personalities
Canadian women journalists
Hip hop models
Living people
Canadian women columnists
York University alumni
Canadian women non-fiction writers
Canadian women television personalities
Participants in American reality television series